The Tattler, with the subtitle 'Newsletter for the East Asian - Australasian Flyway', is produced quarterly by the Australasian Wader Studies Group for distribution to its members and other interested people and organisations.  It is available both as hard-copy and on-line. From 2006 it became available in Chinese- and Indonesian-language versions, as well as in English.

See also
List of ornithology journals

External links
 Australasian Wader Studies Group

Journals and magazines relating to birding and ornithology